Jung Yun-ho (born February 6, 1986), also known by his stage name U-Know Yunho or simply U-Know, is a South Korean singer-songwriter, actor, and a member of the pop duo TVXQ. Born and raised in Gwangju, South Korea, Yunho started his musical training under the talent agency SM Entertainment in 2001 and joined TVXQ in 2003 as the band's leader. Fluent in Korean and Japanese, Yunho has released chart-topping albums throughout Asia as a member of TVXQ. He has made occasional acting appearances in television dramas.

Early life
Yunho was born and raised in Gwangju, South Korea. He has one younger sister. Several members of Yunho's family worked in the legal industry, and Yunho's own childhood dream was to be a prosecutor.

When he was in middle school, he and a few other friends formed the dance team A+, and they competed in various dance competitions around the country. After winning a prize at the 1st Annual SM Best Competition in 1999, Yunho signed with S.M. Entertainment and officially started his training in 2001.

His family, who suffered greatly from the 1997 Asian financial crisis, were initially against his decision to become a singer. To provide for himself while he trained in Seoul, Yunho took up various part-time jobs in the city, such as doing snow removal in the morning and working as a waiter at night. He spent most of his high school vacations in Seoul training and only returned to Gwangju for school. Sometime later, Yunho suffered a hormonal imbalance in his throat and underwent surgery, which affected his vocal cords. After losing his voice, Yunho considered giving up his training.

Throughout his years as a trainee, Yunho was put in four temporary groups - all of which later disbanded. In late 2001, at the age of fifteen, Yunho was featured as a rapper and backup dancer in Dana's debut single "Diamond", and briefly toured with her.

In 2002, Yunho was selected to be a backup dancer for Shinhwa and was chosen to be part of the project boy band Four Seasons, which consisted of fellow trainees Kim Jae-joong, Kim Hee-chul, and Kangin. The project group was dropped when Yunho and Jaejoong joined TVXQ in early 2003.

Yunho's stage name "U-Know", a nickname he has been using since high school, reflected Yunho's position as the leader, who was always trying to understand others.

Music career

TVXQ
The final line-up of TVXQ consisted of Yunho, Max Changmin, Jaejoong, Park Yoo-chun, and Kim Jun-su. The group officially debuted on December 26, 2003 during a BoA and Britney Spears showcase. They performed their debut single "Hug", which became a hit in South Korea. TVXQ have been releasing number one albums in Korea since their second studio album Rising Sun (2005), which was also the album that gave the group their first Daesang (대상), or Grand Award, at the Mnet KM Music Festival. Their fourth Korean album Mirotic (2008) was the Album of the Year at the 2008 Mnet KM Music Festival and the 2008 Golden Disc Awards. The album features the group's most well-known and best-selling single, "Mirotic".

In 2005, TVXQ made their Japanese debut with the single "Stay with Me Tonight", debuting at number 37 on the Oricon Singles Chart. They grabbed their first number-one single in Japan with "Purple Line" (2008). Their fourth Japanese album The Secret Code spawned two platinum-selling singles "Dōshite Kimi o Suki ni Natte Shimattandarō?" and Share the World" (2009), with the latter being a theme song for the anime One Piece.

TVXQ was plunged into legal turmoil when members Jaejoong, Yoochun, and Junsu filed an injunction against their Korean agency in July 2009. This led to their much-publicized departure from the group in 2010. A year later, Yunho and Changmin returned as a duo, releasing albums in both Korean and Japanese. As a duo, TVXQ set sales records and concert attendance records in Japan, becoming the country's best-selling and highest-grossing foreign music act.

Solo career
On May 25, 2015, it was announced that Yunho would release his first Japanese solo extended play U Know Y. Consisting of seven tracks, the mini album includes five songs that were previously performed by Yunho during TVXQ's concerts and solo events in Japan. The new track "Burning Down" was selected to be the album's lead single. Bundled with a DVD that includes a music video and behind-the-scenes footage, U Know Y received a limited release, and was only made available for purchase to members of TVXQ's Japanese fanclub, Bigeast.  The mini album was released on July 8, 2015.

On May 3, 2019, Yunho announced plans to release his first solo Korean-language album.  Yunho's debut extended play, True Colors, was announced on May 28 and was released on June 12 alongside its lead single "Follow".

On December 17, 2020, Yunho announced that he would make his comeback in January 2021.  Yunho's second extended play, Noir, was released on January 18, 2021 alongside its lead single "Thank U".

On February 9, 2022, Yunho released his second Japanese extended play You Go Ahead.

Acting career
Yunho had brief acting cameos on the first few years of his career. He appeared in the MBC sitcom Nonstop 4, and participated in the television drama Vacation and movie Dating on Earth starring all of the members of TVXQ.

Yunho made his official acting debut in 2009, playing the male lead in romantic comedy series Heading to the Ground. However, the series was a commercial flop and sparked criticism from netizens for his lack of acting skills.

From September to December 2010, Yunho starred in his first musical, a remake of the South Korean television drama Goong. From November 2012 to January 2013, Yunho starred in his second musical Gwanghwamun Sonata, a story set in South Korea during the democratic movement in the 1980s.

In 2012, Yunho starred in melodrama King of Ambition, playing a wealthy heir with ice hockey skills. His performance earned him a People's Choice award at the 2013 Seoul International Drama Awards.

In 2014, Yunho starred in the historical action drama Diary of a Night Watchman, playing a swordsman. Yunho was widely praised for his acting, managing fierce action scenes and effectively portraying the delicate emotions of his character.

For his last project before enlistment, Yunho chose to star in the web series I Order You, playing a chef. The series premiered on Naver TVcast in July 2015.

In May 2017, Yunho was confirmed to star in Orion Cinema Network's upcoming romantic mystery drama, Meloholic.

Artistry
Yunho has been given the name "K-pop's dancing king" by critics. He was also the only Asian performer invited to Michael Jackson's tribute concert This Is It, and performed in the Korean leg.  He trained in Los Angeles and Las Vegas with Genevieve Gleary, Morris Pleasure, and others who once worked closely with Jackson.

Ambassadorship
In 2014, Yunho was named honorary ambassador of National Assembly Library.

Personal life
Besides his native Korean, Yunho is fluent in Japanese. He graduated from Myongji University in 2011. He has pursued a master's degree at Chungwoon University.

On March 12, 2021, Yunho violated COVID-19 restrictions when he visited a bar with friends in Gangnam after 10pm. He posted a public apology on his Instagram.    On September 2, 2021, Yunho was cleared of criminal charges and paid a small fine for his curfew violation.

Cyanoacrylate drink poisoning
While TVXQ was filming a variety show on October 14, 2006, Yunho was rushed to the hospital after drinking a beverage laced with super glue, given to him by an anti-fan. The female suspect, whose surname is Ko, was apprehended on October 16. She was a member of an anti-TVXQ website for over two years.

Yunho contacted the police and requested to not press charges against Ko in spite of the potentially severe consequences of what she did. Ko was the same age as Yunho's younger sister, and Yunho stated that the entire event "affected [him] more mentally than physically" while he was recovering from the shock. Circumstances were unclear as to how the culprit managed to enter the set of the variety show.

Military service
Yunho was inducted into the Republic of Korea Armed Forces on July 21, 2015. He received five weeks of basic training at Yangju, Gyeonggi Province, and was the leader of his squad. A completion ceremony for the recruits was held on August 27, and Yunho was awarded with the "Best Recruit" honor. Yunho officially joined the military band for the 26th Mechanized Infantry Division on August 31. He was honored as a Special Warrior on May 9, 2016.
Yunho was honorably discharged from service on April 20, 2017.

Philanthropy 
On March 7, 2022, Yunho donated 50 million won to the Community Chest of Korea for Fruit of Love to help the victims of the massive wildfire that started in Uljin, Gyeongbuk and has spread to Samcheok, Gangwon.

Discography

Extended plays

Songwriting credits

Filmography

Film

Television series

Web series

Variety show

Other shows

Musical theatre

Selected awards

References

External links

 

1986 births
Living people
Japanese-language singers of South Korea
People from Gwangju
Popping dancers
South Korean male idols
South Korean pop singers
South Korean rhythm and blues singers
South Korean male singers
South Korean male film actors
South Korean male television actors
South Korean male musical theatre actors
South Korean male web series actors
SM Entertainment artists
TVXQ members